Alan Davidson (born 17 April 1960 in Airdrie, North Lanarkshire) is a former Scottish football goalkeeper. Davidson is the son of former FIFA referee Bob Davidson.

Early years
Davidson played his youth football with Royal Albert until June 1979, before joining Celtic for the start of season 1979–80. Davidson played in the reserve and youth teams during his season at Celtic Park. He re-joined Royal Albert for the 1980–81 season.

Airdrieonians
Davidson signed for Airdrieonians at the start of the 1981–82 season, where he played in 10 first team matches. Airdrieonians finished bottom of the Scottish Premier Division at the end of that season and were relegated.

Queen of the South (both 1st & 2nd spells combined)
Davidson signed for Queen of the South first time around at the start of season 1982–83 and stayed for six seasons before signing for Australian club Floreat Athena for season 1988–89. Davidson returned at the start of season 1989–90 and stayed for another five seasons. In his two spells with the club Davidson made a total of 364 first team appearances (312 league & 52 cup) and is 10th highest in the club's record appearances list. Davidson played over a decade with Queen of the South during his two spells at the football club.

Davidson is described as being one of Queen of the South's longest club servants during the decade of the 1980s, along with Jimmy Robertson and George Cloy. Former teammates Ted McMinn and Tommy Bryce listed Davidson as among the best players that they played beside at Queens. Barry Nicholson listed Davidson among his favourite players when interviewed on his boyhood as a supporter of Queens.

Floreat Athena
Davidson signed for the Australian club Floreat Athena for season 1988–89, before returning from Perth, Western Australia for his second spell at Palmerston Park.

Albion Rovers & Junior Football
After leaving Queen of the South, Davidson had a short spell with Northern Irish football club Ards F.C. before signing for Albion Rovers at the start of season 1994–95. Davidson stayed at Cliftonhill for three seasons, playing 22 league games, before playing a season with junior outfits Kirkintilloch Rob Roy and Armadale Thistle before retiring from the game at the age of 39.

References

1960 births
Living people
Footballers from Airdrie, North Lanarkshire
Scottish footballers
Scottish Football League players
Queen of the South F.C. players
Airdrieonians F.C. (1878) players
Albion Rovers F.C. players
Kirkintilloch Rob Roy F.C. players
Armadale Thistle F.C. players
Celtic F.C. players
Ards F.C. players
Scottish expatriate footballers
Expatriate soccer players in Australia
Association football goalkeepers
Royal Albert F.C. players
Scottish Junior Football Association players